The 1968 GP Ouest-France was the 32nd edition of the GP Ouest-France cycle race and was held on 27 August 1968. The race started and finished in Plouay. The race was won by Jean Jourden.

General classification

References

1968
1968 in road cycling
1968 in French sport